Isle of Wight Radio is an independent local radio station in Newport on the Isle of Wight. The station began transmitting from Briddlesford Farm AM transmitter on 15 April 1990. Isle of Wight Radio switched to FM in March 1998, its main transmitter is at Chillerton Down on 107FM, with three low power relays on 102FM in Cowes, Ventnor and Ryde.

As of December 2022, the station broadcasts to a weekly audience of 33,000 with a listening share of 8.0%, according to RAJAR.

History

Ownership
Isle of Wight Radio was independently owned for two years before being purchased by GWR (now Global Radio) and then by The Local Radio Company (TLRC). The station then came under the control of a joint venture between TLRC and the Portsmouth FC, under the name of Quadrant Media Limited, which also owned Spirit FM in Chichester and 107.4 The Quay in Portsmouth. In August 2009, the station was sold in a management buyout by programme controller Paul Topping, Claire Willis, Ian Walker and Hedley Finn, making it independently owned again.

In October 2012, it was announced that the station, alongside local Beacon magazine which it owns, was to merge with Media Sound Holdings]], now Total Sense Media, owner of Splash FM, Bright FM, Arrow FM and Sovereign FM, the latter two being former sister stations under TLRC. The merger involved the station's shareholders taking shares in Media Sound Holdings, with Willis and Finn joining the board. It was said that staffing would not be affected with continued broadcast from the Isle of Wight and no plans for content sharing amongst the stations, although this could be considered in future for off-peak hours.

References

External links
Isle of Wight Radio website

Radio stations established in 1990
Radio stations in the Isle of Wight
1990 establishments in England